Paul Gerald Cattermole (born 7 March 1977) is an English singer. He was a member of the group S Club 7, but left the group in 2002.

Early life 
Cattermole was born in St Albans, Hertfordshire. He was a member of the National Youth Music Theatre and appeared in "Pendragon" (1994). He studied  theatre. Simon Fuller picked him for S Club 7.

Career

1999–2002: S Club 7 

Cattermole became a member of S Club 7 after a series of auditions, along with members Tina Barrett, Jon Lee, Bradley McIntosh, Jo O'Meara, Hannah Spearritt and Rachel Stevens in 1999. During five years they released four number one singles and one number one album. They also had a series of TV shows, which were: Miami 7, L.A. 7, Hollywood 7 and Viva S Club. Over the five years they were together, S Club 7 had four UK No.1 singles, one UK No.1 album, a string of hits throughout Europe, including a top-ten single in the United States, Asia, Latin America and Africa.

They recorded a total of four studio albums, released eleven singles and went on to sell over fourteen million albums worldwide. Their first album, S Club, had a strong 1990s pop sound, similar to many artists of their time. However, through the course of their career, their musical approach changed to a more dance and R&B sound. The concept and brand of the group was created by Simon Fuller, also their manager through 19 Entertainment; they were signed to Polydor Records. Their television series went on to last four series, seeing the group travel across the United States and eventually ending up in Barcelona, Spain. It became popular in 100 different countries where the show was watched by over 90 million viewers. As well as the popularity of their television series, S Club 7 won two Brit Awards. Cattermole stayed with the band until June 2002.

2002–2003: Skua and hiatus 
In June 2002 Cattermole reunited with his old school friends and formed the nu metal band Skua—described as having a "Limp Bizkit vibe" as well as comparing their style to Rage Against the Machine. The band split in 2003, after they failed to sign with a record label and the number of shows was low.

2008–2014: S Club 3 

After a five-year on hiatus, it was announced in October 2008 that O'Meara, Cattermole, and McIntosh were to perform as S Club 3. The group consisted of a series of university and nightclub gigs, where they performed a set list consisting of a selection of songs from their Greatest Hits album. This had been performing in various nightclubs, universities and Butlins holiday camps around the United Kingdom. Cattermole sang with his own band at a charity concert called 'The Sounds of Summer' at 'The Lord Taverners' club in London on 27 July 2011. Barrett joined the group for one performance in March 2014, and eventually replaced Paul fully from 2015.

2014–2015: Skua return and S Club 7 reunion 
In January 2014 Skua reformed. On 14 July the band released their first single, "Falling". On 20 July, the released another two singles, "Got Not Choice" and "Out Of Control". Their debut album, Kneel, was released on 14 October. Due to commitments with S Club 7's reunion, Skua found themselves lacking a frontman and the project halted having only released one album. The album was promoted only by the band themselves mainly via social media, no record labels were involved.

In October 2014, it was confirmed that the original lineup would reunite for the first time in over a decade for BBC Children in Need. S Club 7 announced their plans for an arena reunion tour, promptly entitled Bring It All Back 2015, which toured the UK in May 2015. After the S Club 7 full reunion tour, Cattermole decided to leave S Club 3 too.

2015–present: Other projects 
In 2015 Cattermole toured in a production of The Rocky Horror Show in the role of Eddie. He left the tour when received a back injury after a dancer fell on him during an dance number. 

In a 2018 interview with Loose Women Cattermole revealed that, since leaving The Rocky Horror Show cast, he was "working on odd jobs" to make ends meet, and that he had later found regular work as a station manager for a community radio station in Swanage. He also said that he had asked to participate in reality shows such as Celebrity Big Brother, Strictly Come Dancing and Dancing on Ice, but he was not invited to be a contestant.  In 2022, it was revealed that Cattermole had begun providing online tarot cards services.

Personal life 
Cattermole and Hannah Spearritt first met as members of the National Youth Music Theatre in 1994. At the time, Cattermole was 17 years old and Spearritt was 14. They appeared together in Pendragon. In 1999, Cattermole and Spearritt both were selected as members of a seven-member pop group named S Club 7, where they became good friends. In May 2001, the friendship developed into romantic relationship. They kept their relationship a secret for the first six months, waiting until November 2001 to make a public announcement. Their S Club colleagues were supportive of the relationship. Cattermole departed from the group in 2002 but the couple continued to date until early 2006. In June 2015, Cattermole and Spearritt started a romantic relationship again, splitting in November the same year.

Financial issues and bankruptcy 
Cattermole had been declared bankrupt in 2014. In January 2018, he auctioned his Brit Award for Best British Breakthrough Act up on eBay, saying "there are bills to pay." The award eventually closed at £66,100. Cattermole also listed his 2002 Brit for "Don't Stop Movin'" (Best British Single), which hit the same figures, but was ultimately relisted to eventually sell for a more modest £3,000. Cattermole said that half of the payments would go towards paying bills, but was still deciding what to do with the other half.

In February 2018 in an interview with Loose Women, Cattermole stated the depth of his financial burden and thanked the TV producers for giving him a shirt to wear for the interview.

Filmography

References

External links 

1977 births
Alumni of the Mountview Academy of Theatre Arts
English male singers
English pop singers
English psychics
English spiritual mediums
Living people
Musicians from Hertfordshire
Musicians from St Albans
S Club 7 members